Jessie MacLean (born 17 October 1985) is an Australian racing cyclist. She rode at the 2011, 2012 and 2014 UCI Road World Championships, where she won silver with Orica–AIS in the Team Time Trial.

References

External links
 

1985 births
Living people
Australian female cyclists
Sportspeople from Ballarat
20th-century Australian women
21st-century Australian women